Rabia Belhaj Ahmed (born December 15, 1982), also spelled Rabia Benhaj Ahmed, is a Paralympian athlete from Tunisia competing mainly in category T20 and F20 events. She has held the IPC world record in 400m hurdles since 2003.

At the 2009 Global Games in Liberec, she won gold medals in 400m hurdles and long jump.

She competed in the 2012 Summer Paralympics in London.

Athletics
 Women's Long Jump - F20

References

External links 
 

1982 births
Living people
Tunisian female hurdlers
Tunisian long jumpers
Paralympic athletes of Tunisia
World record holders in Paralympic athletics
Athletes (track and field) at the 2012 Summer Paralympics
20th-century Tunisian women
21st-century Tunisian women